Rua is the second album by New Zealand hip-hop group, Moana and the Moahunters.

Released in 1998, the title comes from the Māori word for "two".

Track listing
"Putaatara"
"Warriors"
"Kahu"
"Treaty"
"Prophecies"
"Bird In A Tree"
"Moko"
"Titokowaru"
"AEIOU" (Remix)
"Give It Up Now"
"Hine Tangi-Manawa"
"Ancestors"
"Awe Maria"

Moana and the Moahunters albums
1998 albums